HMS Ness was a White Type  destroyer ordered by the Royal Navy under the 1903 – 1904 Naval Estimates. Named after the River Ness in northern Scotland, flowing through Inverness, she was the first ship to carry this name in the Royal Navy.

Construction
She was laid down on 5 May 1904 at the J Samuel White shipyard at Cowes and launched on 5 January 1905.  She was completed in August 1905.  Her original armament was to be the same as the Turtleback torpedo boat destroyers that preceded her. In 1906 the Admiralty decided to upgrade the armament by landing the five 6-pounder naval guns and shipping three 12-pounder 8 hundredweight (cwt) guns.  Two would be mounted abeam at the foc'x'le break and the third gun would be mounted on the quarterdeck.

Pre-War
After commissioning Ness was assigned to the East Coast Destroyer Flotilla of the 1st Fleet and based at Harwich.

On 27 April 1908 the Eastern Flotilla departed Harwich for live fire and night manoeuvres. During these exercises the cruiser  rammed and sank the destroyer  then damaged .

In April 1909 Ness was assigned to the 3rd Destroyer Flotilla of the 1st Fleet on its formation at Harwich.  She remained until displaced by a  destroyer by May 1912.  She went into reserve assigned to the 5th Destroyer Flotilla of the 2nd Fleet with a nucleus crew.

On 30 August 1912 the Admiralty directed all destroyer classes were to be designated by alpha characters starting with the letter 'A'.  The ships of the River class were assigned to the E class.  After 30 September 1913, she was known as an E-class destroyer and had the letter ‘E’ painted on the hull below the bridge area and on either the fore or aft funnel.

World War I
The 9th Flotilla was a patrol flotilla tasked with anti-submarine and counter mining patrols in the Firth of Forth area. By September 1914, she was deployed to Portsmouth and the Dover Patrol. Here she provided anti-submarine, counter mining patrols and defended the Dover Barrage.

In August 1915 with the amalgamation of the 9th and 7th Flotillas she was deployed to the 7th Destroyer Flotilla based at the River Humber.  She remained employed on the Humber Patrol participating in counter mining operations and anti-submarine patrols for the remainder of the war.

Disposition
In 1919 Ness was paid off then laid up in reserve awaiting disposal.  On 27 May 1919 she was sold to T.R. Sales for breaking.

She was not awarded a Battle Honour for her service.

Pennant Numbers

References

Bibliography
 
 
 
 
 
 
 

 

River-class destroyers
1905 ships